Choraut (Hindi: चोरौत) is a block in Sitamarhi district in the Indian state of Bihar.

Choraut is connected with the national highway from Delhi. This block is near the Nepal border. Janakpur road crosses to Janakpur Dham.Choraut makes up the northern part of Choraut Block. Seven panchayats comprise Choraut:
Choraut Uttari
Choraut Paschimi
Choraut Purvi
{
  "type": "FeatureCollection",
  "features": [
    {
      "type": "Feature",
      "properties": {"fill": "#ff0000","fill-opacity": 0.3,"stroke-width": 0},
      "geometry": {
        "type": "Polygon",
        "coordinates": [
          [
            [
              85.78725814819336,
              26.598965156548456
            ],
            [
              85.78725814819336,
              26.598965156548456
            ],
            [
              85.8051109313965,
              26.588834161167707
            ],
            [
              85.8051109313965,
              26.588834161167707
            ],
            [
              85.80717086791994,
              26.57532477252224
            ],
            [
              85.80717086791994,
              26.57532477252224
            ],
            [
              85.79172134399414,
              26.56427045105015
            ],
            [
              85.79172134399414,
              26.56427045105015
            ],
            [
              85.77043533325195,
              26.557207409547534
            ],
            [
              85.77043533325195,
              26.557207409547534
            ],
            [
              85.76288223266603,
              26.57501772243996
            ],
            [
              85.76288223266603,
              26.57501772243996
            ],
            [
              85.76013565063478,
              26.59436026982275
            ],
            [
              85.76013565063478,
              26.59436026982275
            ],
            [
              85.78725814819336,
              26.59927214240811
            ],
            [
              85.80476760864259,
              26.590369218111913
            ],
            [
              85.78725814819336,
              26.598965156548456
            ]
          ]
        ]
      }
    }
  ]
}Yadupatti
Bhantabari
Barri-behta
Parigama

History 
Choraut is one of the oldest villages in Sitamarhi.

Religion 
Choraut Sthan temple is one of the large temples. Choaraut animal mela is in this area.

Geography 
Rato and Yamuni rivers flow in the west part of Choraut. The rivers flood each year. Choraut is one of the biggest areas of Janakpur Road. In Choraut block one of the best villages is well known on the basis of political views as well as tourist place. In Yadupatti one village situated in the north corner named as Maneshwar nath mandir.

Festival 
Durga puja, Diwali, Chhat puja, Indra puja and Gau pooja are the main festivals of Choraut village. Hindus and Muslims all participate in these festivals.

References 

Sitamarhi district